No Nightingales is a 1944 comedy novel by Caryl Brahms and S.J. Simon, a regular writing team between 1937 and 1950. The title is a reference to the popular wartime song A Nightingale Sang in Berkeley Square. The novel is loosely inspired by the legend of the supposedly haunted townhouse 50 Berkeley Square.

Film adaptation
In 1947 it was turned into a film The Ghosts of Berkeley Square directed by Vernon Sewell and starring Robert Morley, Felix Aylmer, Yvonne Arnaud and Claude Hulbert.

References

Bibliography
 Goble, Alan. The Complete Index to Literary Sources in Film. Walter de Gruyter, 1999.

1944 British novels
Novels set in London
British novels adapted into films
British comedy novels
Michael Joseph books